Alexandre Picard-Hooper (born May 25, 1987) is a Canadian financial advisor and former professional ice hockey player. He most recently played for the Cornwall River Kings of the  Ligue Nord-Américaine de Hockey (LNAH) in the 2012–13 season.

The Baie-Comeau Drakkar selected Picard-Hooper in the 6th round of the 2004 Quebec Major Junior Hockey League (QMJHL) draft after playing parts of two seasons for College Charles-Lemoyne. Picard-Hooper played 3 seasons in Baie-Comeau, scoring 114 times and adding 141 assists in 207 games. He was named the QMJHL and CHL Scholastic Player of the Year in 2007, his third and final season with the Drakkar. Following that season, Picard-Hooper was then traded to the Saint John Sea Dogs.  He scored 23 goals to go along with 45 assists to help lead the young Sea Dogs franchise to the QMJHL semifinals for the first time in club history.

After leaving the QMJHL after the 2008 season, Picard-Hooper played Canadian college hockey with McGill University in the Canadian Interuniversity Sport (CIS) where he was named the 2010-11 CIS Player of the Year and was awarded the Senator Joseph A. Sullivan Trophy.

Picard-Hooper joined Bélisle Picard Group and works as an Investment Advisor Associate.

Awards and honours

References

External links 

1987 births
Baie-Comeau Drakkar players
Canadian ice hockey left wingers
Living people
Saint John Sea Dogs players
People from Boucherville
McGill Redmen ice hockey players
Ice hockey people from Quebec